is a Family Computer video game that was released in 1990.

Summary

The box art shows competitors in an international judo tournament; flags of different countries like the Soviet Union, France, Brazil, the United States of America, and Japan are used to signify the eliteness of the virtual competition. Players must travel around the world in search of judo opponents. The player even gets to compete in the Summer Olympic Games under his discipline of judo after defeating five opponents. However, this would most like refer to either the 1992 Summer Olympic games in Barcelona, Spain because of the game release date. Nine opponents must be defeated in the Olympic Games in order to collect the gold medal. Losing some matches while winning other may result in the awarding of either the silver or the bronze medal.

References

External links
 Moero!! Juudou Warriors at MobyGames

1990 video games
Jaleco games
Japan-exclusive video games
Judo video games
Nintendo Entertainment System games
Nintendo Entertainment System-only games
Video game sequels
Multiplayer and single-player video games
Video games developed in Japan